Kanawha Falls is an unincorporated community in Fayette County, West Virginia, United States. Kanawha Falls had a post office, which opened on March 26, 1856, and closed on November 2, 2002.

Gallery

References

Unincorporated communities in Fayette County, West Virginia
Unincorporated communities in West Virginia
Populated places on the Kanawha River